Diisopinocampheylborane is an organoborane that is useful for asymmetric synthesis. This colourless solid is the precursor to a range of related reagents. The compound was reported in 1961 by Zweifel and Brown in a pioneering demonstration of asymmetric synthesis using boranes. The reagent is mainly used for the synthesis of chiral secondary alcohols.

Preparation
Diisopinocampheylborane was originally prepared by hydroboration of excess α-pinene with borane,
but it is now more commonly generated from borane-methyl sulfide (BMS).

The compound can be isolated as a solid.   However, because it is quite sensitive to water and air, this reagent is often generated in situ and used as a solution.

Diisopinocampheylborane is monomeric, in contrast to diborane and many of its less bulky analogues.

Reactions
Oxidation of diisopinocampheylborane with basic hydrogen peroxide gives isopincampheol.  Methanolysis gives methoxydiisopinocampheylborane

Hydroboration
Because of the large size of the α-pinenyl substituents, diisopinocampheylborane only hydroborates unhindered alkenes.  These reactions proceed with high enantioselectivity. 2-Butene, 2-pentene, 3-hexene are converted to the respective chiral alcohols in high ee's.  Norbornene under the same conditions gave an 83% ee.  Heterocycles (dihydrofuran, dihydrothiophene, dihydropyrrole, tetrahydropyran) give the alcohols in ≥99% ee; the high ee's reflect their constrained conformations.

It adds to alkynes to form the corresponding vinyldiisopinocampheylboranes

In a highly stereoselective reaction, allyldiisopinocampheylboranes converts aldehydes to the homologated alcohols, rapidly even at -100 °C. The alkyldiisopinocampheylboranes, which result from the addition to alkenes, usefully react with a range of different reagents.  Hydroxylamine-O-sulfonic acid  provides 3-pinanamine.

Also useful is the reaction of diisopinocampheylborane with an aldehyde (RCHO) to give the chiral boronic ester, (isopinocampheyl)2BOCH2(R), which can be further used is a number of reactions e.g. Suzuki reaction.

Related campheylboranes

 
Treatment of diisopinocampheylborane with TMEDA give the crystalline adduct of monoisopinocampheylborane.  This adduct reacts with boron trifluoride to liberate the monoisopinocampheylborane (IpcBH2) in 100% ee. Monoisopinocampheylborane reacts with a variety of alkenes.  Two other reagents have been developed for the hydroboration of ketones:

In the above mechanism where G=O and R is Ipc and Cl or 9-Borabicyclononane.  Diisopinocampheylchloroborane (Ipc2BCl) is produced by treating diisopinocampheylborane with hydrogen chloride. The chloride is reported to be more stable that the trialkyl boranes, it works well with aryl alkyl ketones and tert-butyl alkyl ketones. Diisopinocampheylchloroborane is often complementary with diisopinocampheylborane, where one provides the R enantiomer and the other the S, the enantioselectivity is typically very high.

Alpine-borane is produced by hydroborating α-pinene with 9-borabicyclononane. Both of these reagents can be improved upon by using 2-ethylapopinene in place of α-pinene, 2-ethylapopinene has an ethyl group in place of the methyl in α-pinene. The additional steric bulk improves the stereoselectivity of the reduction.

Diisopinocampheylborane reacts with methanol to give diisopinocampheylmethoxyborane, which in turn reacts with an allyl or crotyl Grignard reagent to give B-allyldiisopinocampheylborane. This can then undergo an asymmetric allylboration to give a chiral homologated alcohol, which is a useful building block in a chiral synthesis.

References

Organoboranes
Reagents for organic chemistry